Paluselli is an Italian surname. Notable people with the surname include:

Cristina Paluselli (born 1973), Italian cross country skier 
Ignazio Paluselli (1744–1779), Italian painter

Italian-language surnames